Nuestra Belleza Nuevo León 2010, was held at the Teatro de la Ciudad in Monterrey, Nuevo León on July 20, 2010. At the conclusion of the final night of competition, Cynthia de la Vega of San Pedro Garza García was crowned the winner. De la Vega was crowned by outgoing Nuestra Belleza Nuevo León titleholder, Adriana Treviño. Ten contestants competed for the state title.

The pageant was hosted by Nuestra Belleza Nuevo León 2007 and Miss International 2009 Anagabriela Espinoza and René Strickler.

Results

Placements

Special awards

Judges
Elsa Burgos - Miss Costa Maya International 2002 & Television Hostess
Patricio Cabezut - Television Host
Karla Jiménez - Nuestra Belleza Mundo México 2005
Mariana Lombard - Nuestra Belleza Nuevo León 2006
Jorge Torales - Doctor
Dolores Ávalos - Actress
Tity González - Fashion Designer
Arturo Carmona - Actor
Ana Laura Corral - National Coordinator of Nuestra Belleza México

Background Music
Ballet Folclórico Magisterial
Pablo Montero
Kika Edgar
Myrza Maldonado
María Garza

Contestants

References

External links
Official Website

Nuestra Belleza México